The name bugleweed is a common name which can refer to several unrelated plants:

 Ajuga, especially
 Ajuga reptans, the most common species in the British Isles
 Lycopus, the genus to which the gypsywort belongs